Facundo Tobares (born 23 March 2000) is an Argentine professional footballer who plays as a striker for Aldosivi.

Career
Tobares' career got underway with Aldosivi, after he had signed in December 2014 from local club CA Santa Cruz. Gustavo Álvarez promoted the striker into Aldosivi's first-team in September 2019, ahead of a Primera División fixture with Unión Santa Fe. His professional debut subsequently arrived in the aforementioned match on 27 September, as Tobares replaced Facundo Bertoglio after thirty-five minutes of a home defeat.

Career statistics
.

References

External links

2000 births
Living people
People from Santa Cruz Province, Argentina
Argentine footballers
Association football forwards
Argentine Primera División players
Aldosivi footballers